The Roberts, Johnson and Rand-International Shoe Company Complex is a historic building in St. Louis, Missouri, USA.

Location
The building is located on the corner of Mississippi Street and Hickory Street in St. Louis, Missouri.

History
The building was erected for the Roberts, Johnson and Rand, a shoe manufacturing company later known as the International Shoe Company (which became Furniture Brands International). It was designed by German-born American architect Theodore C. Link. It is notable as one of the first St. Louis factories specifically designed for shoe production.

Architectural significance
It has been listed on the National Register of Historic Places since August 23, 1984.

References

Industrial buildings and structures on the National Register of Historic Places in Missouri
National Register of Historic Places in St. Louis
Shoe factories
1903 establishments in Missouri
Buildings and structures in St. Louis